El jinete negro is a 1961 Mexican film directed by Rogelio A. González. A western parody with an early appearance by Mauricio Garcés, it was one of three ranchera comedies that year by González based on screenplays by Janet Alcoriza (formerly Raquel Rojas) and Fernando Galiana. The other two were El buena suerte and Paloma brava.

References

Films directed by Rogelio A. González
1961 films
Mexican Western (genre) comedy films
1960s Spanish-language films
1960s Mexican films